Nathaniel "Nat" J. S. Jacobs (born 1 December 1939) is an English amateur and professional boxer of the 1950s, 1960s and 1970s, who won the Central (England) Area middleweight title and challenged for the British Boxing Board of Control British middleweight title. He was managed/trained by former boxer Stan Skinkiss.

Boxing career
Born in Manchester, Jacobs began his professional career in November 1960 with a points victory over Sunny Osemegie, and went on to win his first six pro fights. He suffered his first defeat by George Palin in February 1961 after a fourth round disqualification. After two further victories he faced Palin again in June 1961, the fight this time ending in a draw. After a defeat by Eddie Phillips he faced Palin again in January 1962, winning by a third-round knockout. The six fights that followed in 1962 all ended in defeat, but his fortunes improved in 1963 with three straight wins, starting with a points victory over Jimmy Gibson. He had a mixed record during the remainder of 1963 and 1964, including losing a BBofC Central Area Middleweight Title eliminator to Jackie Harwood, and after a defeat by Johnny Angel in May 1964 took a break from competition. He made a comeback in 1965, winning four of his first five fights (including victory over Jim Swords for the vacant BBBofC Central Area middleweight title), and drawing one (against Harwood).

In September 1965 Jacobs fought British middleweight champion Wally Swift in London, initially being named the winner by the referee; After complaints by Swift the fighters were brought back into the ring where the referee explained that he had made a mistake and declared Swift the victor.

Jacobs fought for the British middleweight title in Nottingham in 1966, losing to Johnny Pritchett after the referee stopped the fight after the 13th round following consultation with his seconds. This was one of five straight defeats for Jacobs but he returned to winning ways with a narrow points victory over Terry McTigue in May 1967, after which followed another break from the sport.

He returned in April 1968 with a points victory over Clarence Cassius, which was followed by two defeats. He beat Larry Brown in November 1968 after four rounds, despite a height and weight disadvantage and afterwards announced that he would be moving down to welterweight. He faced British and Empire welterweight champion Ralph Charles at the Royal Albert Hall in 1969 in a fight that was televised by the BBC and also shown in Australia. He continued to box until 1970, his final fight a defeat by Tom Jensen in Valby, Denmark in June that year.

Record

| style="text-align:center" colspan="9"|28 Wins (13 knockouts), 26 Losses, 2 Draws
|- style="text-align:center;background:#e3e3e3"
| style="border-style:none none solid solid"|Res.
| style="border-style:none none solid solid"|Record
| style="border-style:none none solid solid"|Opponent
| style="border-style:none none solid solid"|Type
| style="border-style:none none solid solid"|Round
| style="border-style:none none solid solid"|Time
| style="border-style:none none solid solid"|Date
| style="border-style:none none solid solid"|Location
| style="border-style:none none solid solid"|Notes
|-
|Loss|||| Tom Jensen||PTS||6||||4 June 1970|| Valby Hallen, Valby, Denmark||
|-
|Loss||||Ronnie Hough||TKO||10||||4 May 1970||New Century Hall, Manchester, Lancashire, United Kingdom||BBBofC Central Area middleweight title fight
|-
|Loss||||Ralph Charles||TKO||5 (10)||||15 April 1969||Royal Albert Hall, Kensington, London, United Kingdom||
|-
|Win||||Fred Powney||PTS||8||||24 March 1969||National Sporting Club, Mayfair, London, United Kingdom||
|-
|Win||||Don McMillan||PTS||8||||17 March 1969||Anglo American Sporting Club, Hotel Piccadilly, Manchester, Lancashire, United Kingdom||
|-
|Win||||Larry Brown||RTD||4||||25 November 1968||Broadway Sporting Club, Manchester, Lancashire, United Kingdom||
|-
|Loss||||Mark Rowe||TKO||3||||21 October 1968||Hilton Hotel (Anglo American SC), Mayfair, London, United Kingdom||
|-
|Loss||||Len Gibbs||PTS||8||||30 September 1968||Broadway Sporting Club, Manchester, Lancashire, United Kingdom||
|-
|Win||||Clarence Cassius||PTS||8||||29 April 1968||Free Trade Hall, Manchester, Lancashire, United Kingdom||
|-
|Win||||Terry McTigue||PTS||8||||15 May 1967||King's Hall, Belle Vue, Manchester, Lancashire, United Kingdom||
|-
|Loss|||| Tom Bogs||PTS||10||||2 March 1967|| K.B. Hallen, Copenhagen, Denmark||
|-
|Loss||||Johnny Pritchett||TKO||13 (15)||||21 March 1966||Ice Rink, Nottingham, Nottinghamshire, United Kingdom||Lost BBBofC British middleweight title fight.
|-
|Loss|||| Fabio Bettini||PTS||10||||6 December 1965||Free Trade Hall, Manchester, Lancashire, United Kingdom||
|-
|Loss||||Peter Sharpe||PTS||10||||2 November 1965||Ulster Hall, Belfast, Northern Ireland, United Kingdom||
|-
|Loss||||Wally Swift||PTS||10||||21 September 1965||King's Hall, Belle Vue, Manchester, Lancashire, United Kingdom||
|-
|Win||||Jim Swords||KO||2 (10)||||10 May 1965||Free Trade Hall, Manchester, Lancashire, United Kingdom||BBBofC Central Area middleweight title fight
|-
|Win||||Willie Fisher||TKO||6 (10)||||5 April 1965||Free Trade Hall, Manchester, Lancashire, United Kingdom||
|-
|Draw||||Jackie Harwood||PTS||8||||15 March 1965||Free Trade Hall, Manchester, Lancashire, United Kingdom||
|-
|Win||||Syd Brown||PTS||8||||4 March 1965||The Stadium, Liverpool, Merseyside, United Kingdom||
|-
|Win||||Terry Phillips||TKO||8||||15 February 1965||Free Trade Hall, Manchester, Lancashire, United Kingdom||
|-
|Loss||||Johnny Angel||RTD||6 (8)||||11 May 1964||Free Trade Hall, Manchester, Lancashire, United Kingdom||
|-
|Win||||Peter Sharpe||PTS||8||||13 April 1964||Free Trade Hall, Manchester, Lancashire, United Kingdom||
|-
|Loss||||Ebe Mensah||PTS||8||||25 March 1964||Midlands Sporting Club, Solihull, West Midlands, United Kingdom||
|-
|Win||||Dave George||PTS||8||||9 March 1964||Free Trade Hall, Manchester, Lancashire, United Kingdom||
|-
|Loss||||Jackie Harwood||TKO||6 (10)||||10 February 1964||Free Trade Hall, Manchester, Lancashire, United Kingdom||BBBofC Central Area Middleweight Title eliminator
|-
|Loss|||| Luciano Piazza||PTS||10||||24 January 1964|| PalaLido, Milan, Lombardia, Italy||
|-
|Loss||||Johnny Kramer||PTS||10||||9 December 1963||Free Trade Hall, Manchester, Lancashire, United Kingdom||
|-
|Loss||||Ernest Musso||PTS||8||||27 November 1963||Midlands Sporting Club, Solihull, West Midlands, United Kingdom||
|-
|Win||||Peter McLaren||TKO||9 (10)||||11 November 1963||Free Trade Hall, Manchester, Lancashire, United Kingdom||
|-
|Win||||Bobby Day||KO||1 (10)||||21 October 1963||Free Trade Hall, Manchester, Lancashire, United Kingdom||
|-
|Loss||||Jackie Harwood||PTS||8||||9 September 1963||Free Trade Hall, Manchester, Lancashire, United Kingdom||
|-
|Win||||Gordon Mullin||TKO||3 (8)||||10 June 1963||Free Trade Hall, Manchester, Lancashire, United Kingdom||
|-
|Win||||Jack Burley||KO||1 (8)||||18 March 1963||Free Trade Hall, Manchester, Lancashire, United Kingdom||
|-
|Win||||Jimmy Gibson||PTS||8||||28 February 1963||Kelvin Hall, Glasgow, Scotland, United Kingdom||
|-
|Loss||||Johnny Cooke||PTS||8||||10 December 1962||King's Hall, Belle Vue, Manchester, Lancashire, United Kingdom||
|-
|Loss||||Brian Husband||PTS||6||||10 September 1962||Free Trade Hall, Manchester, Lancashire, United Kingdom||
|-
|Loss||||Maxie Smith||PTS||8||||7 June 1962||Free Trade Hall, Manchester, Lancashire, United Kingdom||
|-
|Loss||||George Palin||PTS||8||||5 March 1962||Preston, Lancashire, United Kingdom||
|-
|Loss||||Tommy Molloy||DQ||3 (10)||||8 February 1962||Preston, Lancashire, United Kingdom||
|-
|Loss||||Jimmy McGrail||TKO||5 (10)||||23 January 1962||Empire Pool, Wembley, London, United Kingdom||
|-
|Win||||George Palin||KO||3 (8)||||15 January 1962||Free Trade Hall, Manchester, Lancashire, United Kingdom||
|-
|Loss||||Cliff Brown||DQ||1 (8)||||8 September 1961||Northampton, Northamptonshire, United Kingdom||
|-
|Draw||||George Palin||PTS||6||||15 June 1961||Free Trade Hall, Manchester, Lancashire, United Kingdom||
|-
|Win||||Eddie Phillips||PTS||4||||8 May 1961||Ice Rink, Nottingham, Nottinghamshire, United Kingdom||
|-
|Win||||Peter Sharpe||PTS||8||||24 April 1961||Northampton, Northamptonshire, United Kingdom||
|-
|Loss||||Maurice Lloyd||DQ||2 (6)||||10 April 1961||Free Trade Hall, Manchester, Lancashire, United Kingdom||
|-
|Win||||Tommy Corrigan||PTS||6||||27 March 1961||Drill Hall, Northampton, Northamptonshire, United Kingdom||
|-
|Win||||Tony Barry||TKO||3 (8)||||13 March 1961||Free Trade Hall, Manchester, Lancashire, United Kingdom||
|-
|Win||||Eddie Phillips||PTS||8||||27 February 1961||Ice Rink, Nottingham, Nottinghamshire, United Kingdom||
|-
|Loss||||George Palin||DQ||4 (6)||||13 February 1961||Free Trade Hall, Manchester, Lancashire, United Kingdom||
|-
|Win||||Eddie Phillips||PTS||6||||24 January 1961||Granby Halls, Leicester, Leicestershire, United Kingdom||
|-
|Win||||Freddie Collins||KO||4 (6)||||16 January 1961||Northampton, Northamptonshire, United Kingdom||
|-
|Win||||Sunny Osemegie||PTS||6||||5 December 1960||Drill Hall, Northampton, Northamptonshire, United Kingdom||
|-
|Win||||Billy Goodwin||KO||1 (6)||||28 November 1960||National Sporting Club, Piccadilly, London, United Kingdom||
|-
|Win||||Tommy Donovan||TKO||4||||21 November 1960||Ice Rink, Nottingham, Nottinghamshire, United Kingdom||
|-
|Win||||Sunny Osemegie||PTS||6||||14 November 1960||Drill Hall, Northampton, Northamptonshire, United Kingdom||Professional debut.

Family
Nat Jacobs' marriage to Kathleen (née Sharpe) (birth registered during January→March  in Nottingham district) was registered during April→June 1958 in Nottingham district, they had children, including; Nathaniel P. Jacobs (born 18 March 1961 in Nottingham district – died 6 March 2002 (aged 40) in Manchester Royal Infirmary). Nat Jacobs is the younger brother of the amateur (Great Britain) and professional lightweight boxer Joseph "Joe" W. S. Jacobs (birth registered April→June 1936 in Manchester South district – died 18 April 1981 (aged 44–45)), and uncle of the amateur and professional boxer (Central (England) Area lightweight champion, British lightweight challenger, British super featherweight Champion, WBO super featherweight challenger), Joey Jacobs (born ).

References

External links
Photograph 'Nat Jacobs' at boxrec.com
People And Friends That I Knew Or Know, And Places That I Worked At – Alan Briggs
Sad loss for family and boxing (Nat Jacobs, Jnr)

Nat Jacobs v Larry Brown November 1968
Ex Boxer Stan Skinkiss – Biography
Jack Birmingham, Nat & Joey Jacobs
Nat Jacobs, Frank Nightingale, Jimmy Swords and Charlie Grice
Nat Jacobs, Jim swords, Charlie Grice, Freddie dobson, frank nightingale, Gerry McBride, Stan Skinkiss at Manchester Ex-Boxers Association
Nat Jacobs, Jim Swords, Freddy Dobson, Paul Dunne, Jack Edwards at Manchester Ex-Boxers Association
Manchester's Champs Camp boxing guru Phil Martin and Joey Jacobs (Junior) former British super featherweight champion

1939 births
Black British sportspeople
English male boxers
Light-middleweight boxers
Light-heavyweight boxers
Living people
Middleweight boxers
Boxers from Manchester
Welterweight boxers